Nimitz High School can refer to:

Nimitz High School (Harris County, Texas)
Nimitz High School (Irving, Texas)